The Valea lui Dan is a right tributary of the river Someșul Mare in Romania. It discharges into the Someșul Mare near Feldru.

References

Rivers of Romania
Rivers of Bistrița-Năsăud County